Tshipise is a town in Vhembe District Municipality in the Limpopo province of South Africa.

Holiday resort 39 km south-east of Musina and 86 km north-east of Louis Trichardt. It was developed from 1936. Formerly spelt Chipise, the name is said to be derived from Tshivenḓa  “tshisima tsha u fhisa”, ‘hot spring’, referring to the mineral springs at 65 °C.

Tshipise is best known for the resort, Tshipise a Forever Resort, that provides refuge for the Swaeltjies (Swallows), the nickname given to pensioned people travelling north to Tshipise a Forever Resort for the winter months. The Swaeltjies stay at the resort's caravan park mostly from April to August as the winter temperatures at Tshipise is around 24 °C during the day, making it a perfect winter vacation destination.

References

Populated places in the Musina Local Municipality